Botanical gardens in Spain have collections consisting entirely of Spain native and endemic species; most have a collection that include plants from around the world. There are botanical gardens and arboreta in all states and territories of Spain, most are administered by local governments, some are privately owned.
 Jardín botánico de Padrón A Coruña, Padrón
 Parque de la Florida Álava, Vitoria
 Arboretum La Alfaguara Alfacar, Granada
 El Huerto del Cura Alicante, Elche
 Cactuslandia Alicante
 Jardín Botánico del Albardinar, Níjar, Almería
 Jardín Botánico Atlántico Asturias, Gijón
 Jardí Botànic de Barcelona (Botanical garden of Barcelona) Barcelona
 Jardí Botànic Històric de Barcelona (Historic botanical garden of Barcelona) Barcelona
 Jardín Botánico de Coria Cáceres, Coria
 Jardín Botánico El Castillejo, Cádiz
 Jardín Botánico Canario Viera y Clavijo Canary Islands, Las Palmas
 Palmetum of Santa Cruz de Tenerife Canary Islands, Santa Cruz de Tenerife
 Jardín de Aclimatación de La Orotava Canary Islands, Puerto de la Cruz
 Cactus Park Canary Islands, Tenerife
 Jardín de Cactus Guatiza – Teguise Canary Islands, Lanzarote
 Zoo Botánico de Jerez Cádiz, Jerez de la Frontera
 Jardín Botánico de Castilla-La Mancha, Albacete, Castilla-La Mancha, España
 Jardín Botánico de Córdoba Córdoba
 Jardín Botánico Marimurtra Gerona, Blanes
 Jardín Botánico Pinya de Rosa Gerona, Blanes
 Jardín Botánico de la Cortijuela, Granada
 El Jardín Botánico Iturrarán Guipúzcoa
 Real Jardín Botánico de Madrid Madrid
 Jardín Botánico Juan Carlos I, Universidad de Alcalá Madrid, Alcalá de Henares
 Jardín Botánico-Histórico la Concepción Málaga
 Jardín Botánico Mundani, Majorca
 El Jardín Botánico del Malecón Murcia
 El Arboreto Carambolo Seville
 Zoo de Matapozuelos, Valladolid
 Jardín Botánico de Soller (Jardí Botànic de Sóller)
 Jardín Botánico de Valencia (Jardí Botànic de Valencia)Valencia
 Arboretum-Pinetum Lucus Augusti (Lugo)

References 

Spain
Botanical gardens